The Shropshire Union Canal, nicknamed  the "Shroppie", is a navigable canal in England.  The Llangollen and Montgomery canals are the modern names of branches of the Shropshire Union (SU) system and lie partially in Wales.

The canal lies in the counties of Staffordshire, Shropshire and Cheshire in the north-west English Midlands. It links the canal system of the West Midlands, at Wolverhampton, with the River Mersey and Manchester Ship Canal at Ellesmere Port, Cheshire,  distant.

The "SU main line" runs southeast from Ellesmere Port on the River Mersey to the Staffordshire and Worcestershire Canal at Autherley Junction in Wolverhampton. Other links are to the Llangollen Canal (at Hurleston Junction), the Middlewich Branch (at Barbridge Junction), which itself connects via the Wardle Canal with the Trent and Mersey Canal, and the River Dee (in Chester). With two connections to the Trent and Mersey (via the Middlewich Branch and the Staffordshire and Worcestershire Canal) the SU is part of an important circular and rural holiday route called the Four Counties Ring.

The SU main line was the last trunk narrow canal route to be built in England. It was not completed until 1835 and was the last major civil engineering accomplishment of Thomas Telford.

The name "Shropshire Union" comes from the amalgamation of the various component companies (Ellesmere Canal, Birmingham and Liverpool Junction Canal, Montgomeryshire Canal) that came together to form the Shropshire Union Railways and Canal Company. The main line between Nantwich and Autherley Junction was almost built as a railway although eventually it was decided to construct it as a waterway.

Route

Wirral Line 
The canal starts from Ellesmere Port on the River Mersey traversing the Wirral peninsula to Chester. This stretch, which was completed in 1797, was originally part of the unfinished Ellesmere Canal. The industrial waterway was intended to connect the Port of Liverpool on the River Mersey to the River Severn at Shrewsbury via the North East Wales Coalfields. However, only eight years after the completion of the contour canal between Netherpool and Chester, the proposed project became uneconomical. This meant the planned  mainline from Chester to Trevor Basin near Wrexham was never constructed. Instead the northern Wirral section was joined to the pre-existing Chester Canal; eventually becoming part of the network Shropshire Union.

Although the Ellesmere Canal was not completed as intended, the central section of the Ellesmere Canal was built. These sections now form part of the waterways: Llangollen Canal and Montgomery Canal. Both are actually branches of the Shropshire Union mainline, although in modern times they are considered to be separate canals.

Chester Canal 
In Chester, from the top of the arm leading down to the Dee, the SU follows the old Chester Canal built in 1772 to connect Chester and Nantwich. The canal passes alongside the city walls of Chester in a deep, vertical red sandstone cutting. After Chester, there are only a few locks as the canal crosses the nearly flat Chester Plain, passes Beeston Castle, and the junctions at Barbridge and Hurleston and arrives at Nantwich basin, the original terminus of the Chester Canal.

The two junctions on this stretch are very important links in the English and Welsh connected network.
 At Barbridge, the Middlewich Branch of the SU goes northeast to Middlewich on the Trent and Mersey Canal (via the tiny Wardle Canal). This was the original planned main line of the Chester Canal, but was in fact built much later than the Nantwich stretch.
 At Hurleston, the old Ellesmere canal from Llangollen and Montgomery made a connection from Frankton Junction eastwards to the old Chester Canal after it was realised that the planned main line from Trevor to Chester along the Dee was never going to be built. This canal eventually merged with the Chester Canal and became the Llangollen Branch of the Shropshire Union. These waters are now known as the Llangollen Canal and (south from Frankton Junction, and still being restored) the Montgomery Canal.

Birmingham and Liverpool Junction Canal 
The odd angle between Nantwich basin and the next stretch of the SU shows that the journey southwards is on a newer (and narrow) canal originally constructed as the narrow Birmingham and Liverpool Junction Canal to connect Nantwich, at the end of the Chester Canal, to the Staffordshire and Worcestershire Canal at Autherley Junction, near Wolverhampton. An important lost link can be seen at Norbury Junction, where a branch (1841) ran south-west through Newport to connect with the Shrewsbury Canal at Wappenshall Junction.

After Nantwich basin, a long sweeping embankment incorporating an aqueduct carries the canal across the main A534 Nantwich-Chester road. The canal then has to climb out of the Cheshire Plain by means of a flight of 15 locks at Audlem. The canal passes through the eastern suburbs of the town of Market Drayton in Shropshire. Further south there are substantial lengths of embankment through the Staffordshire village of Knighton. There is an aqueduct south of Norbury Junction and deep cuttings at Loynton near Woodseaves (Staffordshire), Grub Street, and at Woodseaves (Shropshire).

The canal then continues as the  Shelmore Embankment. Repeated soil slippage during construction meant that this was the last part of the B&L Junction Canal to be opened to traffic. The lengthy embankment is equipped with flood gates at both ends to prevent loss of water should the canal be breached in this area. During World War II these locks were kept closed at night because of the risk of bomb damage.

At Gnosall the canal enters the  Cowley Tunnel.

At Wheaton Aston, the canal climbs its last lock to reach the summit level, fed by the Belvide Reservoir just north of Brewood. North of the reservoir, the canal passes by Stretton Aqueduct over Watling Street (the A5 road).

The SU terminates at Autherley Junction on the Staffs and Worcester Canal. Immediately before the junction is a very shallow stop lock built to prevent the loss of water to the new rival canal from the preexisting Staffordshire and Worcestershire Canal. Unusually, the B&L Junction canal's summit level was designed to be a few inches lower than the older canal, so the newer canal gains a small amount of water each time the lock is cycled (the reverse of the practice usually insisted on by canal companies as a condition for not opposing the construction of a newer one).

Onward links 
The link with the Staffs and Worcester provides a choice of onward journeys:
 Northwards, the S&W meets the Trent and Mersey at Great Haywood junction – allowing journeys east to the Leicester Branch of the Grand Union Canal (or the Trent) or north to the Potteries, Manchester, and the Pennines.
 Southwards, Aldersley Junction is only a mile away, connecting to the BCN Main Line of the Birmingham Canal Navigations (the maze of canals between Wolverhampton and Birmingham) and onwards to the Grand Union Canal main line and London.
 Beyond Aldersley, the S&W is a very popular holiday route down to the River Severn at Stourport.

Gallery

Formation of the "Shropshire Union" company 

The Shropshire Union Railways and Canal Company was formed in 1846. The Ellesmere and Chester canals had amalgamated in 1813, and the absorption of the Birmingham and Liverpool Junction Canal by the Ellesmere and Chester Company was authorised by an Act of Parliament passed in 1845. A further Act, passed in 1846, changed the name of the company to the Shropshire Union Railways and Canal Company and authorised the acquisition of the Shrewsbury Canal and other canals in the east Shropshire network (linking modern-day Telford with the River Severn to the south at Coalport). Then (in 1847), the latter was taken over by the London and North Western Railway Company, which allowed the Shrewsbury Canal and the branch from Norbury Junction to decline.

1945 bank failure 
On 7 September 1945, the bank of the Llangollen branch of the canal failed near , Denbighshire. Escaping water washed away a  section of the trackbed of the Ruabon to Barmouth railway line. A Great Western Railway mail and freight train was derailed, killing one person and injuring two others. The train's consist was entirely destroyed in the ensuing fire, with the exception of a brake van.

2018 bank failure 
A  section of northern bank of the canal failed on 16 March 2018 at an aqueduct over the River Wheelock, near Middlewich, leaving 15 to 20 boats stranded on a  stretch between Wardle Lock and Stanthorne Lock. According to the Canal and River Trust, the breach was caused by a member of the public leaving open a paddle gate on a lock, allowing water into the section of the canal, and causing it to overflow. After emergency repairs costing £3 million, the Middlewich branch of the canal reopened on 21 December 2018.

Restoration 
To promote the interest in, use of, and restoration of parts of the Shropshire Union Canal, the Shropshire Union Canal Society was formed. Today their main restoration activities are on the Montgomery Canal, which is slowly being restored into Wales.

The canal in Chester is promoted by Chester Canal Heritage Trust.

See also 

Canals of the United Kingdom
History of the British canal system
Four Counties Ring – a canal cruising ring that includes part of the Shropshire Union

References

Sources

Further reading 
Gordon Emery – The Old Chester Canal (2005)

External links 

Shropshire Union Canal Society
Old Photographs & Drawings of Chester & Liverpool, The Chester Canal Area part 1
www.geograph.co.uk : photos of The Shropshire Union Canal on Geograph.co.uk
images & map of mile markers seen along the Shroppie

 
Canals in Staffordshire
Canals in Cheshire
Canals in Shropshire
Canals in Wales
Canals opened in 1835
Conservation areas in England
Tourist attractions in Cheshire
Tourist attractions in Shropshire
Tourist attractions in Staffordshire
Transport in Wolverhampton